Le Teich is a commune in the Gironde department in Nouvelle-Aquitaine in southwestern France.

In this commune, there is a park created in order to observe birds without putting them in danger.

Population

See also
Communes of the Gironde department
Parc naturel régional des Landes de Gascogne

References

Communes of Gironde